Bodhisena or Bodaisenna (704–760) was a South Indian Tamil Buddhist scholar and monk known for traveling to Japan and establishing the Kegon school, the Japanese transmission of the Huayan school of Chinese Buddhism.

His stay has been noted in the official history records called the Shoku Nihongi, where he is referred to as Bodai-Senna.

Early years
Bodhisena was born in Madurai around 704 AD. He got mystical inspiration from Manjusri Bodhisattva. He initially went to China, having heard that he could meet the incarnation of Manjusri at Mount Wutai. However, on reaching Mount Wutai, he was told the incarnation was in Japan. He also became acquainted with the tenth Japanese ambassador to China, Tajihi no Mabito Hironari. He also met the Japanese monk Rikyo.

Voyage to Japan
On the invitation of Emperor Shōmu, he visited Japan to establish Huayan Buddhism in the country. He traveled with the Japanese delegation of Tajihi no Hironari, via Cambodia and Champa in Vietnam.

On the same ship were other important historical figures.

They included the traveling companions Genbō and Kibi no Makibi. Genbo was a monk and was returning from China with the over 5,000 fascicles that made up the Chinese Buddhist Canon. Kibi brought with him the arts of embroidery, playing the lyre, and the game of Go.

Life in Japan
The party arrived at Naniwa (Osaka) in August 736 and was met by the monk Gyoki.

According to a number of sources, Gyoki and Bodhisena recognised each other from a past life. According to the Shūi Wakashū, quoting from the Tōdaiji Yōroku, Gyoki stated that they were together at Vulture Peak when the Buddha preached the Lotus Sutra. Bodhisena, called the "Baramon Sojo" (Brahmin Priest), additionally refers to them being together at Kapilavastu. He also recognised Gyoki as the rebirth of the boddhisatva Manjusri he was seeking. Their exchange is recorded thus:

Gyoki:

Baramon Sojo in reply:

Gyoki conducted Bodhisena to Nara and presented him to the emperor. He was treated with great honour and lodged in the temple called Daian-ji, where he founded Kegon Buddhism and also taught Sanskrit.

In 752, Emperor Shōmu asked him to perform the eye-opening ceremony for the giant bronze statue of the Buddha Vairocana built in Tōdai-ji. Dosen also played a significant role. The painting of the eyes was done by Bodhisena.

After a visit to Mount Tomi (Nara), Bodhisena petitioned the emperor to name the prayer hall there , as he found the place to strongly resemble the mountain in India where the Buddha preached, known as Vulture Peak, or Ryoujusen in Japanese.

Bodhisena resided in Daian-ji  in Heijō-kyō for the rest of his life. He died on February 25, 760 at Daian-ji temple, and was buried on the  Ryoujusen mountain, following his wish when he died.

Legacy
Japan's traditional court dance and music still preserve some of the forms introduced by Bodhisena into Japan.

The forty-seven characters of the Japanese script are said to have been devised after the pattern of the Sanskrit alphabet by the Japanese Buddhist Kobo Daishi (774-835 AD). The arrangement of the Japanese syllabary based on the Sanskrit system is also attributed to the influence of Bodhisena in Japan, which, according to Riri Nakayama, “will continue as long as the Japanese language continues to exist”.

See also
 Tōdai-ji
 Heijō-kyō

References

External links
 Daian-ji, Japan 
 Ryōsen-ji, Japan (English summary)
 Tōdai-ji, Japan 
 The Indian who docked at Osaka 

704 births
760 deaths
Indian scholars of Buddhism
Indian Buddhist missionaries
India–Japan relations
Japanese people of Indian descent
Indian royal advisors
Brahmins
Tamil Brahmins
People from Madurai